Chris Killen (born 23 September 1967) is an Australian former cricketer. He played in five first-class and three List A matches for South Australia between 1987 and 1989.

See also
 List of South Australian representative cricketers

References

External links
 

1967 births
Living people
Australian cricketers
South Australia cricketers
People from Dubbo
Cricketers from New South Wales